Riddarholmen Church is the church of the former medieval Greyfriars Monastery in Stockholm, Sweden. The church serves as the final resting place of most Swedish monarchs.

Riddarholmen Church is located on the island of Riddarholmen, close to the Royal Palace in Stockholm, Sweden. The congregation was dissolved in 1807 and today the church is used only for burial and commemorative purposes. Swedish monarchs from Gustavus Adolphus (d. 1632 AD) to Gustaf V (d. 1950) are entombed here (with only one exception: Queen Christina who is buried within St. Peter's Basilica in Rome), as well as the earlier monarchs Magnus III (d. 1290) and Charles VIII (d. 1470). It has been discontinued as a royal burial site in favor of the Royal Cemetery and today is run by departments of the Swedish Government and Royal Court.

It is one of the oldest buildings in Stockholm, parts of it dating to the late-13th century, when it was built as a greyfriars monastery. After the Protestant Reformation, the monastery was closed and the building became a Lutheran church. A spire designed by Flemish architect Willem Boy (1520–1592) was added during the reign of John III, but it was destroyed by a lightning strike on July 28, 1835, after which it was replaced with the present cast-iron spire.

Coats of arms of knights of the Royal Order of the Seraphim are on the walls of the church. When a knight of the Order dies, his coat of arms is hung in the church and when the funeral takes place the church's bells are rung without pause from 12:00 to 13:00.

See also 
List of churches in Stockholm
Gamla stan
Storkyrkan

References

External links 

 The Riddarholm Church at the Royal Court's website

Cemeteries in Sweden
Swedish monarchy
Christianity in Stockholm
Gothic architecture in Sweden
Swedish heraldry
Churches in Stockholm
Churches in the Diocese of Stockholm (Church of Sweden)
13th-century churches in Sweden
Burial sites of Swedish royal houses
Burial sites of the House of Schleswig-Holstein-Sonderburg-Augustenburg
Burial sites of the House of Beauharnais
Burial sites of the House of Bernadotte
Burial sites of the House of Bjelbo
Burial sites of the House of Holstein-Gottorp
Burial sites of the House of Palatinate-Zweibrücken